Kamaleswaram is one of the main suburbs of Thiruvananthapuram, the capital of Kerala, India. It boasts having several temples and mosques which are of historic significance. Attukal Temple is located 1 km from Kamaleswaram. Padmanabhaswamy Temple is located 1.5 kms from Kamaleswaram. Manacaud Valiyapalli is located 500 mtrs from Kamaleswaram. It is also in the vicinity of all major public services. The Trivandrum International Airport is located 4 kms from Kamaleswaram. The Trivandrum Central Railway Station is located 3 kms from Kamaleswaram. The East Fort bus terminal is located 2 kms from Kamaleswaram. Kamaleswaram is situated between Kallattumukku and Manacaud.

Geography

Location
Kamaleswaram is 2 km from the city centre. Privately owned and KSRTC buses plying in the Kovalam route from East Fort pass through Kamaleswaram. A bypass of National Highway 47 passes 1 km to the west of Kamaleswaram. Nearest railway station is Thiruvananthapuram Central, around 3  km away. The nearest airport is Thiruvananthapuram International Airport, around 4 km away. Kamaleswaram is a bustling residential region situated on the way from East Fort to Thiruvallam, in Thiruvananthapuram. The 2000-year-old Thiruvallam Sree Parasurama Temple at Thiruvallam is 4 km away from Kamaleswaram.

Religion
The population of Kamaleswaram mainly practices Hinduism and Islam.
Kamaleswaram Mahadeva Temple is a famous temple in Kerala. It is located near by Govt. Kamaleshwaram Higher Secondary School.

Government offices
 Govt. Kamaleshwaram Higher Secondary School
 Harbour Engineering Department
 Department of Fisheries
 Muttathara Village Office

SNSS Library
SNSS (Sree Narayana Smaraka Grandhasala) Library  is situated in kamaleswaram, which was established 50 years back.

References

External links
 
 
 

Suburbs of Thiruvananthapuram